Jonathan Grey (born January 13, 1992) is a Filipino professional basketball player for the NorthPort Batang Pier of the Philippine Basketball Association (PBA).
 He played for the Benilde Blazers of the NCAA when he was in college.

College career 
Grey played for the Benilde Blazers as early as Season 87.

In Season 90, he was one of the notable snubs from the NCAA All-Star Game, despite averaging 11.8 points, 5.5 rebounds, 3.6 assists, and 1.9 steals. Still, he was chosen to participate in the Slam Dunk Contest. He scored 19 points in a win over the Perpetual Altas to end the first round of eliminations. Unfortunately, the Blazers didn't make the Final Four due to a loss to the Letran Knights.

In Season 91, Grey became the leader for the Blazers after Mark Romero and Paolo Taha turned pro. In a win against the San Sebastian Stags, he had 29 points, 8 rebounds, 6 assists, 3 steals, and 2 blocks. That season, he was able to win the All-Star Game MVP. In a win against the EAC Generals, he had a near triple-double, with 12 points, 9 rebounds, and 10 assists. After that season, he applied for the PBA Draft.

PBA career 
Grey applied for the 2015 PBA Draft, but his application was voided for not meeting the minimum requirement of D-League games played. He then applied for the 2016 Draft, where he was taken with the 7th pick by the Meralco Bolts.

Meralco Bolts 
In his PBA debut, he had 11 points and 4 rebounds in a loss to the Blackwater Elite. He then had a PBA career-high of 24 points against the Phoenix Fuelmasters. He was able to play in the All-Star Game as a member of Gilas, leading them with 19 points against the Luzon All-Stars. His time with Meralco ended when he was traded to Globalport.

Globalport/NorthPort Batang Pier 
Grey was among seven players involved in a trade with Meralco, the NLEX Road Warriors, the TNT Katropa, and the GlobalPort Batang Pier.

In his second season, Grey got to start for the Batang Pier when Terrence Romeo was injured, and scored 13 points in a loss to NLEX during the 2017-18 PBA Philippine Cup. He tied his career-high in points against his former team. In the Commissioner's Cup, he scored a conference high of 16 points in a win over the Columbian Dyip. In Game 1 of their quarterfinals series against the Rain or Shine Elasto Painters, he scored 22 points, including a game-winning three from the corner. However, they were eliminated the next game as he only scored 10 points. They didn't make the playoffs for the Governors' Cup, despite making the quarterfinals the previous two conferences. 

In the 2019 season, he suffered a torn patellar tendon on his left knee, causing him to miss the rest of that season and the 2020 Philippine Cup.

Grey was able to play in the 2021 season before injuring his other patellar tendon.

PBA career statistics

As of the end of the 2021 season

Season-by-season averages

|-
| align=left rowspan=2| 
| align=left | Meralco
| rowspan=2|26 || rowspan=2|10.9 || rowspan=2|.448 || rowspan=2|.222 || rowspan=2|.676 || rowspan=2|1.8 || rowspan=2|.9 || rowspan=2|.4 || rowspan=2|.1 || rowspan=2|4.6
|-
| align=left | GlobalPort
|-
| align=left | 
| align=left | GlobalPort / NorthPort
| 36 || 18.8 || .440 || .293 || .655 || 2.7 || 1.2 || .6 || .2 || 8.9
|-
| align=left | 
| align=left | NorthPort
| 17 || 19.4 || .463 || .381 || .718 || 2.0 || 1.6 || 1.1 || .2 || 9.3
|-
| align=left | 
| align=left | NorthPort
| 14 || 6.7 || .355 || .300 || .786 || 1.2 || .4 || - || .1 || 2.6
|-class=sortbottom
| align="center" colspan=2 | Career
| 93 || 14.9 || .442 || .300 || .684 || 2.1 || 1.1 || .5 || .2 || 6.8

References 

1992 births
Living people
Basketball players from Metro Manila
Filipino men's basketball players
Meralco Bolts players
Benilde Blazers basketball players
NorthPort Batang Pier players
Philippine Basketball Association All-Stars
Shooting guards
Small forwards
Sportspeople from Manila
Meralco Bolts draft picks